Lymantria kebeae is a species of moth of the family Erebidae. It is found in Papua New Guinea.

External links
PaDIL

Lymantria
Moths described in 1904